This is a list of the Russian moth species of the superfamilies Micropterigoidea, Nepticuloidea, Adeloidea, Tischerioidea, Tineoidea, Gracillarioidea and Yponomeutoidea. It also acts as an index to the species articles and forms part of the full List of moths of Russia.

Micropterigoidea

Micropterigidae
Micropterix aruncella (Scopoli, 1763)
Micropterix aureatella (Scopoli, 1763)
Micropterix avarcella Zagulajev, 1994
Micropterix calthella (Linnaeus, 1761)
Micropterix mansuetella Zeller, 1844
Micropterix maschukella Alphéraky, 1876
Micropterix montosiella Zagulajev, 1983
Micropterix sikhotealinensis Ponomarenko & Beljaev, 2000

Eriocraniidae
Dyseriocrania ermolaevi Kozlov, 1983
Dyseriocrania subpurpurella (Haworth, 1828)
Eriocrania chrysolepidella Zeller, 1851
Eriocrania cicatricella (Zetterstedt, 1839)
Eriocrania sakhalinella Kozlov, 1983
Eriocrania salopiella (Stainton, 1854)
Eriocrania sangii (Wood, 1891)
Eriocrania semipurpurella (Stephens, 1835)
Eriocrania sparrmannella (Bose, 1791)
Eriocrania unimaculella (Zetterstedt, 1839)
Eriocrania ussuriella Karsholt, Kozlov & Kristensen, 1997

Hepialidae
Endoclita excrescens (Butler, 1877)
Endoclita sinensis (Moore, 1877)
Gazoryctra chishimana (Matsumura, 1931)
Gazoryctra fuscoargenteus (O. Bang-Haas, 1927)
Gazoryctra ganna (Hübner, [1804])
Gazoryctra macilentus (Eversmann, 1851)
Hepialus humuli (Linnaeus, 1758)
Korscheltellus lupulina (Linnaeus, 1758)
Pharmacis carna ([Denis & Schiffermüller], 1775)
Pharmacis fusconebulosa (De Geer, 1778)
Phymatopus hecta (Linnaeus, 1758)
Phymatopus hectica (O. Bang-Haas, 1927)
Phymatopus japonicus Inoue, 1982
Thitarodes variabilis (Bremer, 1861)
Thitarodes varius (Staudinger, 1887)
Triodia sylvina (Linnaeus, 1761)
Zenophassus schamyl (Christoph, 1888)

Nepticuloidea

Nepticulidae
Bohemannia manschurella Puplesis, 1984
Bohemannia nubila Puplesis, 1985
Bohemannia piotra Puplesis, 1984
Bohemannia pulverosella (Stainton, 1849)
Bohemannia suiphunella Puplesis, 1984
Bohemannia ussuriella Puplesis, 1984
Ectoedemia admiranda Puplesis, 1984
Ectoedemia agrimoniae (Frey, 1858)
Ectoedemia albifasciella (Heinemann, 1871)
Ectoedemia aligera Puplesis, 1985
Ectoedemia amani Svensson, 1966
Ectoedemia angulifasciella (Stainton, 1849)
Ectoedemia arcuatella (Herrich-Schäffer, 1855)
Ectoedemia argyropeza (Zeller, 1839)
Ectoedemia arisi Puplesis, 1984
Ectoedemia atricollis (Stainton, 1857)
Ectoedemia caradjai (Groschke, 1944)
Ectoedemia chasanella Puplesis, 1984
Ectoedemia christopheri Puplesis, 1984
Ectoedemia ermolaevi Puplesis, 1985
Ectoedemia hannoverella (Glitz, 1872)
Ectoedemia heringi (Toll, 1934)
Ectoedemia insularis Puplesis, 1985
Ectoedemia intimella (Zeller, 1848)
Ectoedemia ivinskisi Puplesis, 1984
Ectoedemia laura Puplesis, 1985
Ectoedemia liebwerdella Zimmermann, 1940
Ectoedemia longicaudella Klimesch, 1953
Ectoedemia maculata Puplesis, 1987
Ectoedemia minimella (Zetterstedt, 1839)
Ectoedemia occultella (Linnaeus, 1767)
Ectoedemia olvina Puplesis, 1984
Ectoedemia ornatella Puplesis, 1984
Ectoedemia ortiva Rocienė & Stonis, 2013
Ectoedemia philipi Puplesis, 1984
Ectoedemia picturata Puplesis, 1985
Ectoedemia pilosae Puplesis, 1984
Ectoedemia scoblei Puplesis, 1984
Ectoedemia sinevi Puplesis, 1985
Ectoedemia sivickisi Puplesis, 1984
Ectoedemia spinosella (de Joannis, 1908)
Ectoedemia subbimaculella (Haworth, 1828)
Ectoedemia turbidella (Zeller, 1848)
Etainia capesella (Puplesis, 1985)
Etainia peterseni (Puplesis, 1985)
Etainia sabina (Puplesis, 1985)
Etainia sericopeza (Zeller, 1839)
Etainia tigrinella (Puplesis, 1985)
Fomoria hypericifolia Kuroko, 1982
Fomoria permira Puplesis, 1984
Fomoria septembrella (Stainton, 1849)
Fomoria weaveri (Stainton, 1855)
Stigmella aceris (Frey, 1857)
Stigmella aeneofasciella (Herrich-Schäffer, 1855)
Stigmella aladina Puplesis, 1984
Stigmella alisa Puplesis, 1985
Stigmella alnetella (Stainton, 1856)
Stigmella amuriella Puplesis, 1985
Stigmella anomalella (Goeze, 1783)
Stigmella assimilella (Zeller, 1848)
Stigmella atricapitella (Haworth, 1828)
Stigmella attenuata Puplesis, 1985
Stigmella aurella (Fabricius, 1775)
Stigmella auricularia Puplesis, Diskus & Juchnevic, 2003
Stigmella aurora Puplesis, 1984
Stigmella basiguttella (Heinemann, 1862)
Stigmella benanderella (Wolff, 1955)
Stigmella betulicola (Stainton, 1856)
Stigmella carpinella (Heinemann, 1862)
Stigmella catharticella (Stainton, 1853)
Stigmella confusella (Wood & Walsingham, 1894)
Stigmella continuella (Stainton, 1856)
Stigmella crataegivora Puplesis, 1985
Stigmella dentatae Puplesis, 1984
Stigmella desperatella (Frey, 1856)
Stigmella dryadella (Hofmann, 1868)
Stigmella fervida Puplesis, 1984
Stigmella floslactella (Haworth, 1828)
Stigmella freyella (Heyden, 1858)
Stigmella gimmonella (Matsumura, 1931)
Stigmella glutinosae (Stainton, 1858)
Stigmella hybnerella (Hübner, [1813])
Stigmella incognitella (Herrich-Schäffer, 1855)
Stigmella kazakhstanica Puplesis, 1991
Stigmella kozlovi Puplesis, 1984
Stigmella kurilensis Puplesis, 1987
Stigmella kurokoi Puplesis, 1984
Stigmella lapponica (Wocke, 1862)
Stigmella lediella (Schleich, 1867)
Stigmella lemniscella (Zeller, 1839)
Stigmella lonicerarum (Frey, 1856)
Stigmella lurida Puplesis, 1994
Stigmella luteella (Stainton, 1857)
Stigmella magdalenae (Klimesch, 1950)
Stigmella malella (Stainton, 1854)
Stigmella micromelis Puplesis, 1985
Stigmella microtheriella (Stainton, 1854)
Stigmella minusculella (Hemch-Schaffer, 1855)
Stigmella mirabella (Puplesis, 1984)
Stigmella monella Puplesis, 1984
Stigmella monticulella Puplesis, 1984
Stigmella myrtillella (Stainton, 1857)
Stigmella naturnella (Klimesch, 1936)
Stigmella nivenburgensis (Preissecker, 1942)
Stigmella nostrata Puplesis, 1984
Stigmella nylandriella (Tengstrom, 1848)
Stigmella obliquella (Heinemann, 1862)
Stigmella omelkoi Puplesis, 1984
Stigmella oxyacanthella (Stainton, 1854)
Stigmella palionisi Puplesis, 1984
Stigmella palmatae Puplesis, 1984
Stigmella paradoxa (Frey, 1858)
Stigmella perpygmaeella (Doubleday, 1859)
Stigmella plagicolella (Stainton, 1854)
Stigmella prunetorum (Stainton, 1855)
Stigmella regina Puplesis, 1984
Stigmella roborella (Johansson, 1971)
Stigmella rolandi van Nieukerken, 1990
Stigmella ruficapitella (Haworth, 1828)
Stigmella sakhalinella Puplesis, 1984
Stigmella salicis (Stainton, 1854)
Stigmella samiatella (Zeller, 1839)
Stigmella sashai Puplesis, 1984
Stigmella sorbi (Stainton, 1861)
Stigmella splendidissimella (Herrich-Schäffer, 1855)
Stigmella taigae Puplesis, 1984
Stigmella tegmentosella Puplesis, 1984
Stigmella thuringiaca (Petry, 1904)
Stigmella tiliae (Frey, 1856)
Stigmella tranocrossa Kemperman & Wilkinson, 1985
Stigmella trimaculella (Haworth, 1828)
Stigmella ulmiphaga (Preissecker, 1942)
Stigmella ulmivora (Fologne, 1860)
Stigmella ultima Puplesis, 1984
Stigmella viscerella (Stainton, 1853)
Stigmella zagulaevi Puplesis, 1994
Stigmella zelleriella (Snellen, 1875)
Trifurcula beirnei Puplesis, 1984
Trifurcula chamaecytisi Z.Lastuvka & Lastuvka, 1994
Trifurcula headleyella (Stainton, 1854)
Trifurcula pallidella (Duponchel, 1843)
Trifurcula puplesisi van Nieukerken, 1990
Trifurcula silviae van Nieukerken, 1990
Trifurcula subnitidella (Duponchel, 1843)

Opostegidae
Opostega angulata Gerasimno, 1930
Opostega kuznetzovi Kozlov, 1985
Opostega salaciella (Treitschke, 1833)
Opostega stekolnikovi Kozlov, 1985
Opostegoides albella Sinev, 1990
Opostegoides bicolorella Sinev, 1990
Opostegoides minodensis (Kuroko, 1982)
Opostegoides omelkoi Kozlov, 1985
Opostegoides padiensis Sinev, 1990
Opostegoides sinevi Kozlov, 1985
Pseudopostega auritella (Hübner, [1813])
Pseudopostega crepusculella (Zeller, 1839)

Adeloidea

Heliozelidae
Antispila metallella ([Denis & Schiffermüller], 1775)
Heliozela hammoniella Sorhagen, 1885
Heliozela resplendella (Stainton, 1851)
Heliozela sericiella (Haworth, 1828)
Holocacista rivillei (Stainton, 1855)
Tyriozela porphyrogona Meyrick, 1931

Adelidae
Adela croesella (Scopoli, 1763)
Adela cuprella ([Denis & Schiffermüller], 1775)
Adela mazzolella (Hübner, [1801])
Adela nobilis Christoph, 1882
Adela reaumurella (Linnaeus, 1758)
Adela suffusa Caradja, 1920
Adela violella ([Denis & Schiffermüller], 1775)
Cauchas breviantennella Nielsen & Johansson, 1980
Cauchas canalella (Eversmann, 1844)
Cauchas fibulella ([Denis & Schiffermüller], 1775)
Cauchas florella (Staudinger, 1871)
Cauchas leucocerella (Scopoli, 1763)
Cauchas mikkolai Kozlov, 1993
Cauchas rufifrontella (Treitschke, 1833)
Cauchas rufimitrella (Scopoli, 1763)
Nematopogon adansoniella (De Villers, 1789)
Nematopogon caucasica (Rebel, 1893)
Nematopogon dorsiguttella (Erschoff, 1877)
Nematopogon magna (Zeller, 1878)
Nematopogon metaxella (Hübner, [1813])
Nematopogon pilella ([Denis & Schiffermüller], 1775)
Nematopogon robertella (Clerck, 1759)
Nematopogon schwarziellus Zeller, 1839
Nematopogon swammerdamella (Linnaeus, 1758)
Nemophora agalmatella (Caradja, 1920)
Nemophora amatella (Staudinger, 1892)
Nemophora askoldella (Milliere, 1879)
Nemophora associatella (Zeller, 1839)
Nemophora aurifera (Butler, 1881)
Nemophora basella (Eversmann, 1844)
Nemophora bellela (Walker, 1863)
Nemophora bifasciatella (Issiki, 1930)
Nemophora chalybeella (Bremer, 1864)
Nemophora congruella (Zeller, 1839)
Nemophora cupriacella (Hübner, [1819])
Nemophora degeerella (Linnaeus, 1758)
Nemophora dumerilellus (Duponchel, 1839)
Nemophora fasciella (Fabricius, 1775)
Nemophora insulariella Kozlov, 1997
Nemophora japonica Stringer, 1930
Nemophora karafutonis (Matsumura, 1932)
Nemophora lapikella Kozlov, 1997
Nemophora metallica (Poda, 1761)
Nemophora minimella ([Denis & Schiffermüller], 1775)
Nemophora molella (Hübner, [1816])
Nemophora ochrocephala Kozlov, 1997
Nemophora ochsenheimerella (Hübner, [1813])
Nemophora ommatella Caradja, 1920
Nemophora paradisea Butler, 1881
Nemophora pfeifferella (Hübner, [1813])
Nemophora prodigellus (Zeller, 1853)
Nemophora raddei (Rebel, 1901)
Nemophora rubrofascia (Christoph, 1882)
Nemophora schrencki (Bremer, 1864)
Nemophora sinevi Kozlov, 1997
Nemophora staudingerella (Christoph, 1882)
Nemophora sylvatica Hirowatari, 1995
Nemophora violellus (Stainton, 1851)
Nemophora wakayamensis (Matsumura, 1931)

Prodoxidae
Greya kononenkoi Kozlov, 1996
Greya variabilis Davis & Pellmyr, 1992
Lampronia aeneella (Heinemann, 1870)
Lampronia altaica Zagulajev, 1992
Lampronia capitella (Clerck, 1759)
Lampronia corticella (Linnaeus, 1758)
Lampronia flavimitrella (Hübner, [1817])
Lampronia fuscatella (Tengstrom, 1848)
Lampronia luzella (Hübner, [1817])
Lampronia provectella (Heyden, 1865)
Lampronia pubicornis (Haworth, 1828)
Lampronia redimitella (Lienig & Zeller, 1846)
Lampronia rupella ([Denis & Schiffermüller], 1775)
Lampronia sakhalinella Kozlov, 1996
Lampronia splendidella (Heinemann, 1870)
Lampronia standfussiella Zeller, 1852

Incurvariidae
Alloclemensia devotella (Rebel, 1893)
Alloclemensia mesospilella (Herrich-Schäffer, 1854)
Alloclemensia minima Kozlov, 1987
Incurvaria circulella (Zetterstedt, 1839)
Incurvaria masculella ([Denis & Schiffermüller], 1775)
Incurvaria oehlmanniella  (Hübner, 1796)
Incurvaria pectinea Haworth, 1828
Incurvaria praelatella ([Denis &, Schiffermüller], 1775)
Incurvaria vetulella (Zetterstedt, 1839)
Paraclemensia cyanella (Zeller, 1850)
Paraclemensia incerta (Christoph, 1882)
Phylloporia bistrigella (Haworth, 1828)
Procacitas orientella Kozlov, 1987
Subclemensia taigae Kozlov, 1987
Vespina nielseni Kozlov, 1987

Tischerioidea

Tischeriidae
Coptotriche angusticollella (Duponchel, 1843)
Coptotriche gaunacella (Duponchel, 1843)
Coptotriche heinemanni (Wocke, 1871)
Coptotriche marginea (Haworth, 1828)
Coptotriche orientalis Puplesis & Diskus, 2003
Tischeria decidua Wocke, 1876
Tischeria dodonaea Stainton, 1858
Tischeria ekebladella (Bjerkander, 1795)
Tischeria lvovskyi Kozlov, 1986
Tischeria puplesisi Kozlov, 1986
Tischeria quercifolia Kuroko, 1982
Tischeria relictana Ermolaev, 1986
Tischeria sichotensis Ermolaev, 1986

Tineoidea

Tineidae
Agnathosia chasanica Gaedike, 2000
Agnathosia mendicella ([Denis & Schiffermüller], 1775)
Anomalotinea liguriella (Milliere, 1879)
Archinemapogon assamensis Robinson, 1986
Archinemapogon ussuriensis Zagulajev, 1962
Archinemapogon yildizae Kodak, 1981
Ateliotum hungaricellum Zeller, 1839
Cephimallota chasanica Zagulajev, 1965
Cephimallota crassiflavella Bruand, [1851]
Cephimallota praetoriella (Christoph, 1872)
Cephimallota tunesiella (Zagulajev, 1966)
Cephitinea colonella (Erschoff, 1876)
Ceratuncus affinitellus (Rebel, 1901)
Ceratuncus danubiella (Mann, 1866)
Ceratuncus dzhungaricus Zagulajev, 1971
Crassicornella crassicornella (Zeller, 1847)
Dasyses barbata (Christoph, 1882)
Dryadaula caucasica (Zagulajev, 1970)
Dryadaula multifurcata Gaedike, 2000
Dryadaula ussurica Gaedike, 2000
Dryadaula zinica (Zagulajev, 1970)
Elatobia fuliginosella (Lienig & Zeller, 1846)
Elatobia kostjuki Zagulajev, 1994
Elatobia ussurica Zagulajev, 1990
Eudarcia abhasica (Zagulajev, 1997)
Eudarcia daghestanica (Zagulajev, 1993)
Eudarcia granulatella (Zeller, 1852)
Eudarcia holtzi (Rebel, 1902)
Eudarcia orbiculodomus (Sakai & Saigusa, 1999)
Eudarcia ornata Gaedike, 2000
Eudarcia sinjovi Gaedike, 2000
Euplocamus anthracinalis (Scopoli, 1763)
Haplotinea ditella (Pierce & Diakonoff, 1938)
Haplotinea insectella (Fabricius, 1794)
Infurcitinea finalis (Gozmány, 1959)
Infurcitinea ignicomella (Heydenreich, 1851)
Infurcitinea roesslerella (Heyden, 1865)
Infurcitinea tauridella G.Petersen, 1968
Monopis burmanni G.Petersen, 1979
Monopis christophi G.Petersen, 1957
Monopis crocicapitella (Clemens, 1859)
Monopis imella (Hübner, [1813])
Monopis laevigella ([Denis & Schiffermüller], 1775)
Monopis luteocostalis Gaedike, 2006
Monopis monachella (Hübner, 1796)
Monopis obviella ([Denis & Schiffermüller], 1775)
Monopis pallidella Zagulajev, 1955
Monopis pavlovskii Zagulajev, 1955
Monopis spilotella (Tengstrom, 1848)
Monopis weaverella (Scott, 1858)
Monopis zagulajevi Gaedike, 2000
Montescardia kurenzovi (Zagulajev, 1966)
Montescardia tessulatella (Lienig & Zeller, 1846)
Morophaga bucephala Snellen, 1884
Morophaga choragella ([Denis & Schiffermüller], 1775)
Morophaga fasciculata Robinson, 1986
Morophagoides iranensis G.Petersen, 1960
Morophagoides ussuriensis (Caradja, 1920)
Myrmecozela lutosella (Eversmann, 1844)
Myrmecozela mongolica G.Petersen, 1965
Myrmecozela ochraceella (Tengstrom, 1848)
Myrmecozela rjabovi Zagulajev, 1968
Myrmecozela samurensis Zagulajev, 1997
Nemapogon agnathosella Gaedike, 2000
Nemapogon bachmarensis Zagulajev, 1964
Nemapogon caucasicus Zagulajev, 1964
Nemapogon clematella (Fabricius, 1781)
Nemapogon cloacella (Haworth, 1828)
Nemapogon defrisiensis Zagulajev, 1964
Nemapogon echinata Gaedike, 2000
Nemapogon fungivorella (Benander, 1939)
Nemapogon gerasimovi (Zagulajev, 1961)
Nemapogon gliriella (Heyden, 1865)
Nemapogon granella (Linnaeus, 1758)
Nemapogon gravosaella G.Petersen, 1957
Nemapogon hungaricus Gozmány, 1960
Nemapogon inconditella (D.Lucas, 1956)
Nemapogon meridionella (Zagulajev, 1962)
Nemapogon nevella Zagulajev, 1963
Nemapogon nigralbella (Zeller, 1839)
Nemapogon orientalis G.Petersen, 1961
Nemapogon picarella (Clerck, 1759)
Nemapogon quercicolella (Zeller, 1852)
Nemapogon robusta Gaedike, 2000
Nemapogon ruricolella (Stainton, 1849)
Nemapogon somchetiella Zagulajev, 1961
Nemapogon teberdellus (Zagulaj ev, 1963)
Nemapogon variatella (Clemens, 1859)
Nemapogon wolfierella (Karsholt & Nielsen, 1976)
Nemaxera betulinella (Paykull, 1785)
Neurothaumasia ankerella (Mann, 1867)
Niditinea fuscella (Linnaeus, 1758)
Niditinea nigrocapitella (Zagulajev, 1960)
Niditinea striolella (Matsumura, 1931)
Niditinea truncicolella (Tengstrom, 1848)
Niditinea tugurialis (Meyrick, 1932)
Oinophila v-flava (Haworth, 1828)
Opogona nipponica (Staudinger, 1871)
Pararhodobates syriacus (Lederer, 1857)
Psychoides phaedrospora (Meyrick, 1935)
Reisserita relicinella (Zeller, 1839)
Scardia amurensis Zagulajev, 1965
Scardia boletella (Fabricius, 1794)
Scardia caucasica Zagulajev, 1965
Stenoptinea cyaneimarmorella (Milliere, 1854)
Tinea bothniella Svensson, 1953
Tinea columbariella Wocke, 1877
Tinea dubiella Stainton, 1859
Tinea fuscocostalis Gaedike, 2006
Tinea omichlopis Meyrick, 1928
Tinea pallescentella Stainton, 1851
Tinea pellionella Linnaeus, 1758
Tinea semifulvella Haworth, 1828
Tinea steueri G.Petersen, 1966
Tinea svenssoni Opheim, 1965
Tinea translucens Meyrick, 1917
Tinea trinotella Thunberg, 1794
Tineola bisselliella (Hummel, 1823)
Triaxomasia orientanus (Ponomarenko & Park, 1996)
Triaxomera caucasiella Zagulajev, 1959
Triaxomera fulvimitrella (Sodoffsky, 1830)
Triaxomera kurilensis Zagulajev, 1996
Triaxomera parasitella (Hübner, 1796)
Trichophaga bipartiella (Ragonot, 1858)
Trichophaga scandinaviella Zagulajev, 1960
Trichophaga tapetzella (Linnaeus, 1758)
Trichophaga ziniella Zagulajev, 1960
Wegneria panchalcella (Staudinger, 1871)

Galacticidae
Galactica pluripunctella Caradja, 1920
Galactica walsinghami (Caradja, 1920)
Zarcinia melanozestas Meyrick, 1935

Eriocottidae
Deuterotinea casanella (Eversmann, 1844)

Lypusidae
Lypusa maurella ([Denis & Schiffermüller], 1775)

Psychidae
Acanthopsyche atra (Linnaeus, 1767)
Acanthopsyche ecksteini (Lederer, 1855)
Acanthopsyche murzini Solanikov, 1994
Acanthopsyche semiglabra Solanikov, 2004
Acanthopsyche subatrata I.Kozhantshikov, 1956
Acanthopsyche tshemalica Solanikov, 1996
Acanthopsyche uralensis (Freyer, 1852)
Acentra vestalis (Staudinger, 1871)
Anaproutia caucasica (Solanikov, 1991)
Anaproutia elongatella (I.Kozhantshikov, 1956)
Anaproutia norvegica (Heylaerts, 1882)
Anaproutia sichotealinica (Solanikov, 1981)
Apterona helicoidella (Vallot, 1827)
Atelopsycha mataea Meyrick, 1937
Bacotia claustrella (Bruand, 1845)
Bijugis bombycella ([Denis & Schiffermüller], 1775)
Bijugis pectinella ([Denis & Schiffermüller], 1775)
Bijugis proxima (Lederer, 1853)
Bijugis subgrisea I.Kozhantshikov, 1956
Canephora hirsuta (Poda, 1761)
Dahlica charlottae (Meier, 1957)
Dahlica dubatolovi (Solanikov, 1990)
Dahlica kabardica Solanikov, 2002
Dahlica kurentzovi (Solanikov, 1990)
Dahlica lazuri (Clerck, 1759)
Dahlica lichenella (Linnaeus, 1761)
Dahlica maritimella (Solanikov, 1990)
Dahlica modestella (Solanikov, 1990)
Dahlica pallidella (Zagulajev, 1997)
Dahlica samurensis (Zagulajev, 1993)
Dahlica triquetrella (Hübner, [1813])
Diplodoma adzharica Zagulajev, 1985
Diplodoma laichartingella (Goeze, 1783)
Diplodoma samurica Zagulajev, 1992
Diplodoma talgica Zagulajev, 1993
Eosolenobia grisea Filipjev, 1924
Eosolenobia suifunella (Christoph, 1882)
Epichnopterix crimaeana I.Kozhantshikov, 1956
Epichnopterix moskvensis Solanikov, 2001
Epichnopterix plumella ([Denis & Schiffermüller], 1775)
Eumelasina ardua I.Kozhantshikov, 1956
Kozhantshikovia borisi Solanikov, 1990
Megalophanes stetinensis Hering, 1846
Megalophanes viciella ([Denis & Schiffermüller], 1775)
Montanima aurea Hattenschwiler, 1996
Narycia archipica Zagulajev, 2002
Narycia duplicella (Goeze, 1783)
Narycia maschukella Zagulajev, 1994
Narycia tarkitavica Zagulajev, 1993
Oiketicoides borealis (I.Kozhantshikov, 1956)
Oiketicoides lutea (Staudinger, 1870)
Oiketicoides senex (Staudinger, 1871)
Oiketicoides simulans I.Kozhantshikov, 1956
Pachythelia villosella (Ochsenheimer, 1810)
Phalacropterix graslinella (Boisduval, 1852)
Praesolenobia desertella (Rebel, 1919)
Proutia betulina (Zeller, 1839)
Proutia rotunda Suomalainen, 1990
Pseudobankesia caucasica (I.Kozhantshikov, 1956)
Psyche baikalensis (Raigorodskaia, 1965)
Psyche casta (Pallas, 1767)
Psyche crassiorella (Bruand, 1851)
Psyche ghilarovi (Solanikov, 1991)
Psyche kunashirica Solanikov, 2000
Psychidea alba Solanikov, 1990
Psychidea nudella (Ochsenheimer, 1810)
Psychocentra millierei (Heylaerts, 1879)
Ptilocephala muscella ([Denis & Schiffermüller], 1775)
Ptilocephala plumifera (Ochsenheimer, 1810)
Rebelia catandella Solanikov, 1998
Rebelia herrichiella Strand, 1912
Rebelia nocturnella (Alphéraky, 1876)
Reisseronia staudingeri (Heylaerts, 1879)
Siederia cembrella (Linnaeus, 1761)
Siederia pineti (Zeller, 1852)
Siederia rupicolella (Sauter, 1954)
Sterrhopterix fusca (Haworth, 1809)
Sterrhopterix sachalina Matsumura, 1931
Sterrhopterix standfussi (Wocke, 1851)
Taleporia borealis Wocke, 1862
Taleporia euxina Zagulajev, 1997
Taleporia politella (Ochsenheimee, 1816)
Taleporia tubulosa (Retzius, 1783)
Typhonia alla (Zolotuhin & Prokovjev, 1998)
Typhonia korbi (Rebel, 1906)
Typhonia multivenosa (I.Kozhantshikov, 1956)
Typhonia punctata (Herrich-Schäffer, 1855)
Whittleia undulella (Fischer von Röslerstamm, [1837])

Gracillarioidea

Roeslerstammiidae
Roeslerstammia erxlebella (Fabricius, 1787)
Roeslerstammia pronubella ([Denis & Schiffermüller], 1775)

Douglasiidae
Klimeschia transversella (Zeller, 1839)
Tinagma balteolellum (Fischer von Röslerstamm, [1841])
Tinagma columbellum (Staudinger, 1880)
Tinagma dryadis Staudinger, 1872
Tinagma matutinellum Zeller, 1872
Tinagma minutissima (Staudinger, 1880)
Tinagma mongolicum Gaedike, 1991
Tinagma ocnerostomellum (Stainton, 1850)
Tinagma perdicellum Zeller, 1839
Tinagma signatum Gaedike, 1991

Bucculatricidae
Bucculatrix abdita Seksjaeva, 1989
Bucculatrix abrepta Seksjaeva, 1989
Bucculatrix absinthii Gartner, 1865
Bucculatrix albedinella (Zeller, 1839)
Bucculatrix albella Stainton, 1867
Bucculatrix altera Seksjaeva, 1989
Bucculatrix anthemidella Deschka, 1992
Bucculatrix applicita Seksjaeva, 1989
Bucculatrix aquila Seksjaeva, 1992
Bucculatrix argentisignella Herrich-Schäffer, 1855
Bucculatrix armata Seksjaeva, 1989
Bucculatrix armeniaca Deschka, 1992
Bucculatrix artemisiella Herrich-Schäffer, 1855
Bucculatrix bechsteinella (Bechstein & Scharfenberg, 1805)
Bucculatrix bicinica Seksjaeva, 1992
Bucculatrix bifida Seksjaeva, 1989
Bucculatrix bisucla Seksjaeva, 1989
Bucculatrix cidarella (Zeller, 1839)
Bucculatrix citima Seksjaeva, 1989
Bucculatrix comporabile Seksjaeva, 1989
Bucculatrix cristatella (Zeller, 1839)
Bucculatrix demaryella (Duponchel, 1840)
Bucculatrix eclecta Braun, 1963
Bucculatrix frangutella (Goeze, 1783)
Bucculatrix gnaphaliella (Treitschke, 1833)
Bucculatrix humiliella Herrich-Schäffer, 1855
Bucculatrix laciniatella Benander, 1931
Bucculatrix latviaella Sulcs, 1990
Bucculatrix locuples Meyrick, 1919
Bucculatrix lovtsovae Baryshnikova, 2013
Bucculatrix lustrella Snellen, 1884
Bucculatrix maritima Stainton, 1851
Bucculatrix nigricomella (Zeller, 1839)
Bucculatrix noltei Petry, 1912
Bucculatrix nota Seksjaeva, 1989
Bucculatrix notella Seksjaeva, 1996
Bucculatrix parasimilis Baryshnikova, 2005
Bucculatrix pectinifera Baryshnikova, 2007
Bucculatrix pyrivorella Kuroko, 1964
Bucculatrix ratisbonensis Stainton, 1861
Bucculatrix similis Baryshnikova, 2005
Bucculatrix sinevi Seksjaeva, 1988
Bucculatrix splendida Seksjaeva, 1992
Bucculatrix telavivella Amsel, 1935
Bucculatrix thoracella (Thunberg, 1794)
Bucculatrix transversella Caradja, 1920
Bucculatrix ulmella Zeller, 1848
Bucculatrix ulmicola Kuznetzov, 1962
Bucculatrix ulmifoliae Hering, 1931
Bucculatrix ussurica Seksjaeva, 1996
Bucculatrix varia Seksjaeva, 1989

Gracillariidae
Acrocercops amurensis Kuznetzov, 1960
Acrocercops brongniardella (Fabricius, 1798)
Acrocercops infuscatus Caradja, 1920
Acrocercops transecta Meyrick, 1931
Aristaea bathracma (Meyrick, 1912)
Aristaea kumatai Kuroko, 1982
Aristaea pavoniella (Zeller, 1847)
Aspilapteryx limosella (Duponchel, 1844)
Aspilapteryx tringipennella (Zeller, 1839)
Callisto albicinctella Kuznetzov, 1979
Callisto coffeella (Zetterstedt, 1839)
Callisto denticulella (Thunberg, 1794)
Callisto elegantella Kuznetzov, 1979
Callisto insperatella (Nickerl, 1864)
Caloptilia acericola Kumata, 1966
Caloptilia aceris Kumata, 1966
Caloptilia alchimiella (Scopoli, 1763)
Caloptilia alni Kumata, 1966
Caloptilia alnivorella Chambers, 1875
Caloptilia azaleella (Brants, 1913)
Caloptilia betulicola (Hering, 1928)
Caloptilia cuculipennella (Hübner, 1796)
Caloptilia elongella (Linnaeus, 1761)
Caloptilia falconipennella (Hübner, [1813])
Caloptilia fidella (Reutti, 1853)
Caloptilia flava (Staudinger, 1871)
Caloptilia fribergensis (Fritzsche, 1871)
Caloptilia gloriosa Kumata, 1966
Caloptilia hemidactylella ([Denis & Schiffermüller], 1775)
Caloptilia heringi Kumata, 1966
Caloptilia hidakensis Kumata, 1966
Caloptilia honoratella (Rebel, 1914)
Caloptilia issikii Kumata, 1982
Caloptilia kisoensis Kumata, 1982
Caloptilia korbiella (Caradja, 1920)
Caloptilia leucothoes Kumata, 1982
Caloptilia mandschurica (Christoph, 1882)
Caloptilia monticola Kumata, 1966
Caloptilia onustella (Hübner, [1813])
Caloptilia orientalis Ermolaev, 1979
Caloptilia populetorum (Zeller, 1839)
Caloptilia pulverea Kumata, 1966
Caloptilia pyrrhaspis (Meyrick, 1931)
Caloptilia robustella Jackh, 1972
Caloptilia roscipennella (Hübner, 1796)
Caloptilia rufipennella (Hübner, 1796)
Caloptilia sachalinella Ermolaev, 1984
Caloptilia sapporella (Matsumura, 1931)
Caloptilia schisandrae Kumata, 1966
Caloptilia semifascia (Haworth, 1828)
Caloptilia stigmatella (Fabricius, 1781)
Caloptilia suberinella (Tengstrom, 1848)
Caloptilia ulmi Kumata, 1982
Caloptilia variegata Kuznetzov & Baryshnikova, 2001
Calybites magnifica (Stainton, 1867)
Calybites phasianipennella (Hübner, [1813])
Calybites quadrisignella (Zeller, 1839)
Calybites securinella (Ermolaev, 1986)
Cameraria acericola Kumata, 1963
Cameraria niphonica Kumata, 1963
Cameraria ohridella Deschka & Dimic, 1986
Chrysaster hagicola Kumata, 1961
Cryptolectica chrysalis Kumata & Ermolaev, 1988
Cupedia cupediella (Herrich-Schäffer, 1855)
Dialectica imperialella (Zeller, 1847)
Dialectica scalariella (Zeller, 1850)
Epicephala relictella Kuznetzov, 1979
Eteoryctis deversa (Meyrick, 1922)
Euspilapteryx aureola (Kumata, 1982)
Euspilapteryx auroguttella (Stephens, 1835)
Gracillaria albicapitata Issiki, 1930
Gracillaria arsenievi (Ermolaev, 1977)
Gracillaria loriolella Frey, 1881
Gracillaria syringella (Fabricius, 1794)
Gracillaria ussuriella (Ermolaev, 1977)
Hyloconis improvisella (Ermo1aev, 1986)
Hyloconis lespedezae Kumata, 1963
Hyloconis puerariae Kumata, 1963
Leucospilapteryx anaphalidis Kumata, 1965
Leucospilapteryx omissella (Stainton, 1848)
Liocrobyla desmodiella Kuroko, 1982
Micrurapteryx gerasimovi Ermolaev, 1989
Micrurapteryx gradatella (Herrich-Schäffer, 1855)
Micrurapteryx kollariella (Zeller, 1839)
Ornixola caudulatella (Zeller, 1839)
Parectopa ononidis (Zeller, 1839)
Parornix alni Kumata, 1965
Parornix altaica Noreika & Bidzilya, 2006
Parornix anglicella (Stainton, 1850)
Parornix anguliferella (Zeller, 1847)
Parornix avellanella (Stainton, 1854)
Parornix carpinella (Frey, 1863)
Parornix devoniella (Stainton, 1850)
Parornix ermolaevi Kuznetzov, 1979
Parornix extrema Kuznetzov & Baryshnikova, 2003
Parornix fagivora (Frey, 1861)
Parornix finitimella (Zeller, 1850)
Parornix fumidella Kuznetzov, 1979
Parornix kumatai Ermolaev, 1993
Parornix loganella (Stainton, 1848)
Parornix maliphaga Kuznetzov, 1979
Parornix mixta (Triberti, 1980)
Parornix multimaculata (Matsumura, 1931)
Parornix petiolella (Frey, 1863)
Parornix polygrammella (Wocke, 1862)
Parornix retrusella Kuznetzov, 1979
Parornix scoticella (Stainton, 1850)
Parornix szoecsi (Gozmány, 1952)
Parornix torquillella (Zeller, 1850)
Parornix traugotti Svensson, 1976
Phyllocnistis chlorantica Seksjaeva, 1992
Phyllocnistis cornella Ermolaev, 1987
Phyllocnistis extrematrix Martynova, 1955
Phyllocnistis labyrinthella (Bjerkander, 1790)
Phyllocnistis saligna (Zeller, 1839)
Phyllocnistis unipunctella (Stephens, 1834)
Phyllocnistis valentinensis Hering, 1936
Phyllocnistis vitella Ermolaev, 1987
Phyllonorycter platani (Staudinger, 1870)
Phyllonorycter acerifoliella (Zeller, 1839)
Phyllonorycter acutissimae (Kumata, 1963)
Phyllonorycter agilella (Zeller, 1846)
Phyllonorycter anderidae (W.Fletcher, 1875)
Phyllonorycter apparella (Herrich-Schäffer, 1855)
Phyllonorycter bicinctella (Matsumura, 1931)
Phyllonorycter blancardella (Fabricius, 1781)
Phyllonorycter caraganella (Ermo1aev, 1986)
Phyllonorycter carpini (Kumata, 1963)
Phyllonorycter cavella (Ze11er, 1846)
Phyllonorycter celtidis (Kumata, 1963)
Phyllonorycter cerasicolella (Herrich-Schäffer, 1855)
Phyllonorycter comparella (Duponchel, 1843)
Phyllonorycter connexella (Zeller, 1846)
Phyllonorycter coryli (Nicelli, 1851)
Phyllonorycter corylifoliella (Hübner, 1796)
Phyllonorycter cretata (Kumata, 1957)
Phyllonorycter cydoniella ([Denis & Schiffermüller], 1775)
Phyllonorycter dakekanbae (Kumata, 1963)
Phyllonorycter dubitella (Herrich-Schäffer, 1855)
Phyllonorycter emberizaepennella (Bouche, 1834)
Phyllonorycter ermani (Kumata, 1963)
Phyllonorycter esperella (Goeze, 1783)
Phyllonorycter froelichiella (Zeller, 1839)
Phyllonorycter fruticosella (Kuznetzov, 1979)
Phyllonorycter gerasimowi (M.Hering, 1930)
Phyllonorycter ginnalae (Ermolaev, 1981)
Phyllonorycter gracilis Noreika, 1994
Phyllonorycter harrisella (Linnaeus, 1761)
Phyllonorycter heegeriella (Zeller, 1846)
Phyllonorycter hilarella (Zetterstedt, 1839)
Phyllonorycter insignitella (Zeller, 1846)
Phyllonorycter issikii (Kumata, 1963)
Phyllonorycter japonica (Kumata, 1963)
Phyllonorycter jezoniella (Matsumura, 1931)
Phyllonorycter joannisi (Le Marchand, 1936)
Phyllonorycter jozanae (Kumata, 1967)
Phyllonorycter junoniella (Zeller, 1846)
Phyllonorycter kisoensis Kumata & Park, 1978
Phyllonorycter klemannella (Fabricius, 1781)
Phyllonorycter kuhlweiniella (Zeller, 1839)
Phyllonorycter kuznetzovi (Ermolaev, 1982)
Phyllonorycter laciniatae (Kumata, 1967)
Phyllonorycter lantanella (Schrank, 1802)
Phyllonorycter laurocerasi (Kuznetzov, 1979)
Phyllonorycter lautella (Zeller, 1846)
Phyllonorycter macrantherella (Kuznetzov, 1961)
Phyllonorycter maestingella (Muller, 1764)
Phyllonorycter malella (Gerasimov, 1931)
Phyllonorycter malicola (Kuznetzov, 1979)
Phyllonorycter matsudai (Kumata, 1986)
Phyllonorycter medicaginella (Gerasimov, 1930)
Phyllonorycter melacoronis (Kumata, 1963)
Phyllonorycter messaniella (Zeller, 1846)
Phyllonorycter mongolicae (Kumata, 1963)
Phyllonorycter muelleriella (Zeller, 1839)
Phyllonorycter nicellii (Stainton, 1851)
Phyllonorycter nigrescentella (Logan, 1851)
Phyllonorycter nigristella (Kumata, 1957)
Phyllonorycter nipponicella (Issiki, 1930)
Phyllonorycter orientalis (Kumata, 1963)
Phyllonorycter oxyacanthae (Frey, 1856)
Phyllonorycter pastorella (Zeller, 1846)
Phyllonorycter pomiella (Gerasimov, 1933)
Phyllonorycter populi (Filipjev, 1931)
Phyllonorycter populialbae (Kuznetzov, 1961)
Phyllonorycter populifoliella (Treitschke, 1833)
Phyllonorycter pseudojezoniella Noreika, 1994
Phyllonorycter pseudolautella (Kumata, 1963)
Phyllonorycter pterocaryae (Kumata, 1963)
Phyllonorycter pumilae (Ermolaev, 1981)
Phyllonorycter pyrifoliella (Gerasimov, 1933)
Phyllonorycter quercifoliella (Zeller, 1839)
Phyllonorycter quinqueguttella (Stainton, 1851)
Phyllonorycter rajella (Linnaeus, 1758)
Phyllonorycter reduncata (Ermolaev, 1986)
Phyllonorycter ringoniella (Matsumura, 1931)
Phyllonorycter roboris (Zeller, 1839)
Phyllonorycter rolandi (Svensson, 1966)
Phyllonorycter sagitella (Bjerkander, 1790)
Phyllonorycter salicicolella (Sircom, 1848)
Phyllonorycter salictella (Zeller, 1846)
Phyllonorycter schreberella (Fabricius, 1781)
Phyllonorycter scitulella (Duponchel, 1843)
Phyllonorycter scopariella (Zeller, 1846)
Phyllonorycter sibirica Kuznetzov & Baryshnikova, 2001
Phyllonorycter similis Kumata, 1982
Phyllonorycter sorbi (Frey, 1855)
Phyllonorycter sorbicola (Kumata, 1963)
Phyllonorycter spinicolella (Zeller, 1846)
Phyllonorycter stettinensis (Nicelli, 1852)
Phyllonorycter strigulatella (Lienig & Zeller, 1846)
Phyllonorycter suberifoliella (Zeller, 1850)
Phyllonorycter takagii (Kumata, 1963)
Phyllonorycter tenerella (de Joannis, 1915)
Phyllonorycter trifasciella (Haworth, 1828)
Phyllonorycter trifoliella (Gerasimov, 1933)
Phyllonorycter tristrigella (Haworth, 1828)
Phyllonorycter turanica (Gerasimov, 1931)
Phyllonorycter uchidai (Kumata, 1963)
Phyllonorycter ulmi (Kumata, 1963)
Phyllonorycter ulmifoliella (Hübner, [1817])
Phyllonorycter valentina (Ermolaev, 1981)
Phyllonorycter viciae (Kumata, 1963)
Phyllonorycter viminetorum (Stainton, 1854)
Phyllonorycter watanabei (Kumata, 1963)
Povolnya leucapennella (Stephens, 1835)
Psydrocercops wisteriae (Kuroko, 1982)
Sauterina hofmanniella (Schleich, 1867)
Spulerina astaurota (Meyrick, 1922)
Spulerina castaneae Kumata & Kuroko, 1988
Spulerina corticicola Kumata, 1964
Spulerina dissotoma (Meyrick, 1931)
Telamoptilia tiliae Kumata & Kuroko, 1988

Yponomeutoidea

Yponomeutidae
Argyresthia abdominalis Zeller, 1839
Argyresthia albistria (Haworth, 1828)
Argyresthia arceuthina Zeller, 1839
Argyresthia aurulentella Stainton, 1849
Argyresthia bergiella (Ratzeburg, 1840)
Argyresthia bonnetella (Linnaeus, 1758)
Argyresthia brockeella (Hübner, [1813])
Argyresthia conjugella Zeller, 1839
Argyresthia curvella (Linnaeus, 1761)
Argyresthia dilectella Zeller, 1847
Argyresthia fundella (Fischer von Röslerstamm, [1835])
Argyresthia glabratella (Zel1er, 1847)
Argyresthia glaucinella Zeller, 1839
Argyresthia goedartella (Linnaeus, 1758)
Argyresthia illuminatella Zeller, 1839
Argyresthia ivella (Haworth, 1828)
Argyresthia kurentzovi Gershenson, 1988
Argyresthia laevigatella (Heydenreich, 1851)
Argyresthia praecocella Zeller, 1839
Argyresthia pruniella (Clerck, 1759)
Argyresthia pulchella Lienig & Zeller, 1846
Argyresthia pygmaeella ([Denis & Schiffermüller], 1775)
Argyresthia retinella Zeller, 1839
Argyresthia semifavella Christoph, 1882
Argyresthia semifusca (Haworth, 1828)
Argyresthia semitestacella (Curtis, 1833)
Argyresthia sorbiella (Treitschke, 1833)
Argyresthia spinosella Stainton, 1849
Argyresthia submontana Frey, 1871
Atemelia torquatella (Lienig & Zeller, 1846)
Cedestis gysseleniella Zeller, 1839
Cedestis piniariella Zeller, 1847
Cedestis subfasciella (Stephens, 1834)
Euhyponomeuta secunda Moriuti, 1977
Euhyponomeuta stannella (Thunberg, 1794)
Euhyponomeutoides albithoracellus Gaj, 1954
Euhyponomeutoides ribesiellus (de Joannis, 1900)
Euhyponomeutoides trachydelta (Meyrick, 1931)
Kessleria alternans (Staudinger, 1870)
Kessleria caflischiella (Frey, 1880)
Kessleria caucasica Friese, 1960
Kessleria fasciapennella (Stainton, 1849)
Kessleria saxifragae (Stainton, 1868)
Ocnerostoma friesei Svensson, 1966
Paraswammerdamia albicapitella (Scharfenberg, 1805)
Paraswammerdamia conspersella (Tengstrom, 1848)
Paraswammerdamia lapponica (W.Petersen, 1932)
Paraswammerdamia lutarea (Haworth, 1828)
Paraswammerdamia ornichella Friese, 1960
Prays beta Moriuti, 1977
Prays fraxinella (Bjerkander, 1784)
Prays ruficeps (Heinemann, 1854)
Pseudoswammerdamia combinella (Hübner, 1786)
Saridoscelis kodamai Moriuti, 1961
Scythropia crataegella (Linnaeus, 1767)
Swammerdamia caesiella (Huner, 1796)
Swammerdamia compunctella Herrich-Schäffer, 1851
Swammerdamia glaucella Junnilainen, 2001
Swammerdamia passerella (Zetterstedt, 1839)
Swammerdamia pyrella (De Villers, 1789)
Xyrosaris lichneuta Meyrick, 1918
Yponomeuta anatolicus Stringer, 1930
Yponomeuta cagnagella (Hübner, [1813])
Yponomeuta catharotis Meyrick, 1935
Yponomeuta cinefactus Meyrick, 1935
Yponomeuta diffluellus Heinemann, 1870
Yponomeuta eurinellus Zagulajev, 1969
Yponomeuta evonymella (Linnaeus, 1758)
Yponomeuta falkovitshi Gershenson, 1998
Yponomeuta gershensoni Sinev, 2007
Yponomeuta griseomaculatus Gershenson, 1969
Yponomeuta irrorella (Hübner, 1796)
Yponomeuta kostjuki Gershenson, 1985
Yponomeuta malinella Zeller, 1838
Yponomeuta nigrifimbriatus Christoph, 1882
Yponomeuta orientalis Zagulajev, 1969
Yponomeuta padella (Linnaeus, 1758)
Yponomeuta pauciflore Efremov, 1969
Yponomeuta plumbella ([Denis & Schiffermüller], 1775)
Yponomeuta polystictus Butler, 1879
Yponomeuta polystigmellus Felder & Felder, 1862
Yponomeuta refrigeratus Meyrick, 1931
Yponomeuta rorrella (Hübner, 1796)
Yponomeuta vigintipunctatus (Retzius, 1783)
Zelleria hepariella Stainton, 1849
Zelleria silvicolella Moriuti, 1977

Ypsolophidae
Ochsenheimeria capella Moschler, 1860
Ochsenheimeria mediopectinella (Haworth, 1828)
Ochsenheimeria taurella ([Denis & Schiffermüller], 1775)
Ochsenheimeria urella Fischer von Röslerstamm, [1842]
Ochsenheimeria vacculella Fischer von Röslerstamm, [1842]
Phrealcia ussuriensis (Rebel, 1901)
Ypsolopha acuminata (Butler, 1878)
Ypsolopha affinitella (Staudinger, 1892)
Ypsolopha albiramella (Mann, 1861)
Ypsolopha albistriata (Issiki, 1930)
Ypsolopha alpella ([Denis & Schiffermüller], 1775)
Ypsolopha amoenella (Christoph, 1882)
Ypsolopha asperella (Linnaeus, 1761)
Ypsolopha blandella (Christoph, 1882)
Ypsolopha chazariella (Mann, 1866)
Ypsolopha contractella (Caradja, 1920)
Ypsolopha coriacella (Herrich-Schäffer, 1855)
Ypsolopha costibasella Caradja, 1939
Ypsolopha cristata Moriuti, 1977
Ypsolopha dentella (Fabricius, 1775)
Ypsolopha ephedrella Christoph, 1873
Ypsolopha falcella ([Denis & Schiffermüller], 1775)
Ypsolopha horridella (Treitschke, 1835)
Ypsolopha leuconotella (Snellen, 1884)
Ypsolopha longa Moriuti, 1964
Ypsolopha lucella (Fabricius, 1775)
Ypsolopha melanofuscella Ponomarenko & Zinchenko, 2013
Ypsolopha mucronella (Scopoli, 1763)
Ypsolopha nebulella (Staudinger, 1871)
Ypsolopha nemorella (Linnaeus, 1758)
Ypsolopha nigrofasciata Yang, 1977
Ypsolopha nigrimaculata Byun & Park, 2001
Ypsolopha parallela (Caradja, 1939)
Ypsolopha parenthesella (Linnaeus, 1761)
Ypsolopha persicella (Fabricius, 1787)
Ypsolopha sarmaticella (Rebel, 1917)
Ypsolopha satellitella (Staudinger, 1871)
Ypsolopha scabrella (Linnaeus, 1761)
Ypsolopha seniculella (Christoph, 1872)
Ypsolopha sequella (Clerck, 1759)
Ypsolopha straminella Ponomarenko & Zinchenko, 2013
Ypsolopha strigosa (Butler, 1879)
Ypsolopha sylvella (Linnaeus, 1767)
Ypsolopha tsugae Moriuti, 1977
Ypsolopha uniformis (Filipjev, 1929)
Ypsolopha ustella (Clerck, 1759)
Ypsolopha vittella (Linnaeus, 1758)
Ypsolopha yasudai Moriuti, 1964

Plutellidae
Eidophasia albifasciata lssiki, 1930
Eidophasia hufnagelii (Zeller, 1839)
Eidophasia messingiella (Fischer von Röslerstamm, [1840])
Plutella xylostella (Linnaeus, 1758)
Plutelloptera hyperboreella (Strand, 1902)
Plutelloptera kyrkella Baraniak, 2007
Plutelloptera mariae (Rebel, 1923)
Pseudoplutella porrectella (Linnaeus, 1758)
Rhigognostis annulatella Zeller, 1857
Rhigognostis incarnatella (Steude1, 1873)
Rhigognostis japonica (Moriuti, 1977)
Rhigognostis kuusamoensis Kyrki, 1989
Rhigognostis schmaltzella (Zetterstedt, 1839)
Rhigognostis senilella (Zetterstedt, 1839)
Rhigognostis sibirica Kyrki, 1989

Acrolepiidae
Acrolepia autumnitella Curtis, 1838
Acrolepiopsis assectella (Zeller, 1839)
Acrolepiopsis betulella (Curtis, 1850)
Acrolepiopsis clavivalvatella Moriuti, 1972
Acrolepiopsis delta (Moriuti, 1961)
Acrolepiopsis issikiella (Moriuti, 1961)
Acrolepiopsis kostjuki Budashkin, 1998
Acrolepiopsis luteocapitella (Caradja, 1926)
Acrolepiopsis orchidophaga Moriuti, 1982
Acrolepiopsis peterseni Gaedike, 1994
Acrolepiopsis postomacula (Matsumura, 1931)
Acrolepiopsis sapporensis (Matsumura, 1931)
Acrolepiopsis sinense Gaedike, 1971
Acrolepiopsis sinjovi Gaedike, 1994
Acrolepiopsis ussurica Zagulajev, 1981
Digitivalva arnicella (Heyden, 1863)
Digitivalva christophi (Toll, 1958)
Digitivalva orientella (Klimesch, 1956)
Digitivalva pulicariae (Klimesch, 1956)
Digitivalva reticulella (Hübner, 1796)
Digitivalva sibirica (Toll, 1958)
Digitivalva solidaginis (Staudinger, 1859)
Digitivalva valeriella (Snellen, 1878)
Digitivalvopsis paradoxa (Moriuti, 1982)

Glyphipterigidae
Glyphipterix argyroguttella Ragonot, 1885
Glyphipterix basifasciata Issiki, 1930
Glyphipterix bergstraesserella (Fabricius, 1781)
Glyphipterix beta Moriuti & Saito, 1964
Glyphipterix equitella (Scopoli, 1763)
Glyphipterix forsterella (Fabricius, 1781)
Glyphipterix funditrix Diakonoff & Arita, 1976
Glyphipterix gianelliella Ragonot, 1885
Glyphipterix haworthana (Stephens, 1834)
Glyphipterix japonicella Zeller, 1877
Glyphipterix loricatella (Treitschke, 1833)
Glyphipterix magnatella Erschoff, 1877
Glyphipterix maritima Diakonoff, 1979
Glyphipterix nigromarginata Issiki, 1930
Glyphipterix regula Diakonoff & Arita, 1976
Glyphipterix schoenicolella Boyd, 1859
Glyphipterix simplicella Christoph, 1882
Glyphipterix simpliciella (Stephens, 1834)
Glyphipterix speculiferella Christoph, 1882
Glyphipterix thrasonella (Scopoli, 1763)
Lepidotarphius perornatella (Walker, 1864)
Orthotelia sparganella (Thunberg, 1788)

Heliodinidae
Heliodines roesella (Linnaeus, 1758)

Lyonetiidae
Leucoptera ermolaevi Seksjaeva, 1990
Leucoptera heringiella Toll, 1938
Leucoptera laburnella (Stainton, 1851)
Leucoptera lotella (Stainton, 1859)
Leucoptera lustratella (Herrich-Schäffer, 1855)
Leucoptera malifoliella (Costa, [1836])
Leucoptera spartifoliella (Hübner, [1813])
Leucoptera ussuriella Seksjaeva, 1988
Lyonetia castaneella Kuroko, 1964
Lyonetia clerkella (Linnaeus, 1758)
Lyonetia ledi Wocke, 1859
Lyonetia prunifoliella (Hübner, 1796)
Lyonetia pulverulentella Zeller, 1839
Microthauma lespedezella Seksjaeva, 1990
Paraleucoptera sinuella (Reutti, 1853)
Proleucoptera celastrella Kuroko, 1964

Bedelliidae
Bedellia somnulentella (Zeller, 1847)

References 

Moths